The Special Constables Act 1831 (full title - 1 & 2 W. IV. c. 41 - An Act for amending the Laws relative to the Appointment of Special Constables, and for the better Preservation of the Peace) was a UK act of parliament, given royal assent on 15 October 1831.

It provided a long-term framework for the use, appointment and operation of special constables in England and Wales. It is often seen as the foundation date for the Metropolitan Special Constabulary, the special constabulary attached to the Metropolitan Police, which had itself been founded only two years earlier.

See also
Special Constabulary#History

References

1831 in British law
Police legislation in the United Kingdom
Act 1831
United Kingdom Acts of Parliament 1831